National Movement Party may refer to one of the following parties:

 Nationalist Movement Party in Turkey
 Egyptian Patriotic Movement